The men's Twenty20 cricket tournament at the 2017 Southeast Asian Games took place at Kinrara Oval in Selangor from 26 to 29 August 2017. 6 teams were split into 2 round-robin groups. 1st placed teams in each group qualified for gold medal final while 2nd placed teams qualified for bronze medal final.

Competition schedule
The following was the competition schedule for the men's Twenty20 competitions:

Results
All times are Malaysia Standard Time (UTC+08:00)

Group stage

Group A

Updated to matches played on 27 August 2017. Source

Group B

Updated to matches played on 27 August 2017. Source

Play-offs

3rd place play-off

Final

References

Men's twenty20 tournament